Gian Corrado "Gianni" Gross (11 February 1942 – 30 June 2016) was a breaststroke swimmer from Italy.

Biography
He competed at the 1964 Summer Olympics in the 200 m breaststroke and 4 × 100 m medley relay and reached the final in the relay. He won a gold medal in the 100 m at the 1967 Mediterranean Games.

References

External links
 
 
 

1942 births
2016 deaths
Swimmers from Berlin
Italian male swimmers
Olympic swimmers of Italy
Swimmers at the 1964 Summer Olympics
Mediterranean Games medalists in swimming
Mediterranean Games gold medalists for Italy
Swimmers at the 1967 Mediterranean Games
20th-century Italian people